Cirrus Airlines Luftfahrtgesellschaft mbH was a German regional airline with its head office in Hallbergmoos and its maintenance facilities at Saarbrücken Airport. It operated both charter and scheduled flights, the latter on behalf of Lufthansa, Swiss International Air Lines and Air Moldova. Its main bases and hubs were Saarbrücken Airport and Mannheim City Airport. The company slogan was connecting business.

History

Cirrus Airlines was founded in February 1995 as Cirrus Luftfahrtgesellschaft mbH and operated an executive charter business. In March 1998, Cirrus Airlines received its licence to operate scheduled passenger services between Saarbrücken Airport and Hamburg. In August 1999, Cirrus Airlines took over Cosmos Air, its Dornier 328 and the route between Mannheim and Berlin Tempelhof and Baden Air in 2000.

In February 2000, upon the 5th anniversary of Cirrus Airlines, it established a cooperative partnership with German-owned Lufthansa and became a Team Lufthansa franchise member. In April that year, Cirrus received licences to operate regularly scheduled service between Mannheim City Airport and Hamburg Airport and between Berlin and Sylt.

Cirrus steadily expanded its business, with scheduled services operating mainly from Saarbrücken Airport and Mannheim City Airport to domestic destinations. 
The following years the airline started to decentralize its operations, also flying low-density point-to-point routes and adding Embraer-Jets to its Turboprop-Fleet.

In 2004 Cirrus Airlines took over Augsburg Airways, a Lufthansa Regional member. The headquarters were consequently moved to Hallbergmoos, near Munich Airport. Cirrus Technik and Cirrus Flight Training remained at Saarbrücken Airport.

The company introduced a modified corporate identity in January 2008.
Cirrus Airlines was a company within Aviation Investment Corp. along with Cirrus Maintenance and Cirrus Service.

On 20 January 2012, the airline ceased operations and flew all aircraft back to Saarbrücken. This left some airports temporarily without scheduled service, like Hof Airport and Mannheim City Airport.

Destinations
Cirrus Airlines served the following destinations:

Hamburg Airport
Zürich Airport 
Mannheim City Airport 
Munich Airport
Hof Airport
Ohrid
Skopje 
Chișinău Airport
Frankfurt Airport
Cologne 
Kiel Airport
Berlin-Tempelhof
Berlin-Tegel Airport
Dresden Airport
Olbia Airport
Heringsdorf Airport
Sylt Airport
Erfurt Airport
London City
Rostock Airport
Stuttgart Airport
Bern
Salzburg
Vienna Airport
Brno Airport

Fleet

Cirrus Airlines operated the following aircraft during its existence:

 1 Airbus A310 D-AHLC
 2 Boeing 737-500/800 D-ACIN, D-ALIG
 8 De Havilland Canada DHC-8 Dash 8
 8 Embraer ERJ-145
19 Dornier 328-Turboprop and -Jet (1 donated to École Nationale D'Aérotechnique)
 3 Embraer ERJ-170
 1 Beechcraft Super King Air 200

Incidents and accidents
 June 28, 2006: A Cirrus Airlines Embraer 145 flying on behalf of Swiss International Air Lines overshoots the runways in Nuremberg. None of the 49 occupants on board are hurt. 

 March 19, 2008: Flight 1567 from Berlin-Tempelhof overshoots runway 27 of the Mannheim City Airport and comes to rest on a wall close to a highway. Five of the 27 people on board is hurt, and the aircraft, a Dornier 328 (D-CTOB), is severely damaged.

References

External links

Defunct airlines of Germany
Airlines established in 1995
Airlines disestablished in 2012
Saarbrücken
Companies based in Saarland
German companies disestablished in 2012
German companies established in 1995